Nothing Else is the official debut studio album by American electronic musician Lorn. It was released on Brainfeeder on June 7, 2010. The album was mastered by Clark.

Critical reception

Rob Wacey of AllMusic stated that the album "was a resounding success, receiving widespread acclaim." He said, "Many noted its evocative nature throughout, depicting tones and textures of melancholy, paranoia, and aggressiveness through an unwavering dark electronic sound palette and crystalline production techniques." Si Truss of Fact praised "its melancholy intensity and its sheer aggressive force" as "an effect achieved by the combination of Lorn's meticulous, clever production and some aggressive mastering care of UK producer Chris Clark." He added, "there's little denying that Nothing Else is an exceptionally strong full-length debut from an artist with clear talent."

Track listing

Personnel
Credits adapted from liner notes.

 Lorn – production
 Clark – mastering

References

External links
 
 

2010 albums
Brainfeeder albums
Electronic albums by American artists